Sinclair Mills is a community located on the north bank of the Fraser River between McGregor and Longworth in central British Columbia.

Via Rail's Jasper – Prince Rupert train calls at the Sinclair Mills railway station.

Per January 2010 there are only 19 Families living in actual Sinclair Mills. It is a quiet, rural community in the scenic Upper Fraser Valley, with a fantastic backdrop of the western foothills of the Rockies and also the Cariboo Mountains.

The majority of the current inhabitants are either in farming, trapping, hunting and outfitting, or they are retired. Those who do work in other sectors, usually commute to work in the city of Prince George (app. 100 km) or its surrounding areas.

The beautiful surroundings offer great hiking, fishing and hunting, as well as all sorts of ATV-ing, snowmobiling and backcountry-skiing opportunities. 
There is a small heli-ski lodge and also two licensed hunting outfitters in the village, who accept visitors.

The community association, called the "Sinclair Mills Education and Recreational Club" is very active to bring together the "neighbourhood" and to raise funds for projects (e.g. the Giscome Elementary School re-construction) in the entire Upper Fraser Valley. 
The association has currently 55 member families from Longworth, Hutton, Sinclair Mills, Upper Fraser, Aleza Lake, Giscome, Willow River and Prince George.

Sinclair Mills is conveniently close to a bigger city and an international airport (Prince George/ YXS), but also remote enough to keep those happy who cherish old-fashioned, quiet, safe, neighbourly Canadian country life.

"Bearpaw Heli-skiing", a ski lodge offering helicopter skiing and scenic views of the area, opened in 2011/12.

References
BCGNIS Geographical Name Query

Jan 2010 additions by Elke Hierl-Steinbauer / Sinclair Mills

Populated places in the Regional District of Fraser-Fort George